Dave Moorcroft (born 16 March 1947 in Liverpool, England) is a footballer who played as centre back for Skelmersdale United, Dallas Tornado in the North American Soccer League, and Tranmere Rovers.

References

1947 births
Living people
English footballers
Footballers from Liverpool
Association football central defenders
Everton F.C. players
Preston North End F.C. players
Skelmersdale United F.C. players
Dallas Tornado players
Tranmere Rovers F.C. players
English Football League players
North American Soccer League (1968–1984) players
English expatriate footballers
Expatriate soccer players in the United States
English expatriate sportspeople in the United States